Whipple House may refer to:

in the United States
(by state then town)
Whipple House (Kittery, Maine), listed on the National Register of Historic Places in York County, Maine
John Whipple House, Ipswich, Massachusetts, listed on the NRHP
A. Whipple House, Uxbridge, Massachusetts, listed on the NRHP
Whipple House (Ashland, New Hampshire), listed on the NRHP in Grafton County
Whipple House (Bristol, New Hampshire), listed on the New Hampshire State Register of Historic Places
Dr. Solomon M. Whipple House, New London, New Hampshire, listed on the NRHP in Merrimack County
Whipple-Jenckes House, Cumberland, Rhode Island, listed on the NRHP
Whipple-Cullen House and Barn, Lincoln, Rhode Island, listed on the NRHP
Whipple-Angell-Bennett House, North Providence, Rhode Island, listed on the NRHP
Nelson Wheeler Whipple House, Salt Lake City, Utah, listed on the NRHP
Whipple-Lacey House, Cheyenne, Wyoming, listed on the NRHP in Laramie County